Heliobolus bivari, also known commonly as Bivar's bushveld lizard, is a species of lizard in the family Lacertidae. The species is endemic to southwestern Angola.

Heliobolus bivari measure on average  in snout–vent length. The tail is long, averaging .

References

Heliobolus
Lacertid lizards of Africa
Reptiles of Angola
Endemic fauna of Angola
Reptiles described in 2022
Taxa named by Aaron M. Bauer
Taxa named by Luis M. P. Ceríaco
Taxa named by Matthew P. Heinicke